Sir William Henry Lionel Cox  (1844 – November 1921) was a British lawyer and judge. He served as Chief Justice of the Straits Settlements in the late 19th and early 20th centuries.

Early life

Cox was born in 1844 in Mauritius, the son of physician George B. Cox, and was educated at the Royal College, Mauritius and the University of London.  He was called to the Bar at the Middle Temple in 1866.

Legal appointments

In 1880, Cox was appointed Substitute Procureur and Advocate General of Mauritius, and in August of that year Puisne Judge of the Supreme Court. In August 1886 he became Procureur and Advocate-General, which position he held until his elevation on 8 November 1893 to Chief Justice of the Straits Settlements

He was knighted in 1896.

In 1896, Cox denied an application for a writ of habeas corpus to free Jose Rizal who was being transported on a Spanish warship back to the Philippines when the ship stopped in Singapore.

Marriages

Cox married first, Lucy Pelte, of Mauritius, who died in 1900; and, secondly, in 1903 in Yokohama, Elizabeth Cushing Pughe, daughter of Lewis Pughe of Scranton, Pennsylvania.

Retirement

Cox retired to England in 1906.  In 1915, he was living in Guernsey and was almost blind.

Death

Cox died in Guernsey in 1921.  A special service was held in the Singapore Supreme Court to remember him.

Street names

Lionel Cox Street in Curepipe, Mauritius and Cox Terrace in Fort Canning Park, Singapore are named after Cox.

References

1844 births
1921 deaths
British Mauritius judges
Members of the Middle Temple
Chief Justices of the Straits Settlements
Straits Settlements judges
Knights Bachelor
Date of birth missing
Date of death missing